Delias weiskei is a butterfly in the family Pieridae. It was described by Carl Ribbe in 1900. It is endemic to New Guinea (Angabunga and Aroa Rivers). The name honours Emil Weiske.

The wingspan is about 45–48 mm. Adults are similar to Delias leucias, but have a smaller discal patch on the underside of the hindwings.

Subspecies
Delias weiskei weiskei (Aroa River, Papua New Guinea)
Delias weiskei sayuriae K. Okano, 1989 (Kerowagi, Papua New Guinea)

References

External links
Delias at Markku Savela's Lepidoptera and Some Other Life Forms

weiskei
Butterflies described in 1900
Endemic fauna of New Guinea